C'est La Vie, Mon Chéri or New Endless Love is a series starring Fiona Sit and Aloys Chen based on an adaptation of the 1994 Hong Kong movie, also known as C'est la vie, mon chéri. Both the movie and the series are directed by Derek Yee.

Synopsis 
The story starts out with Kit and Mun being complete strangers. Kit breaks up with superstar Tracy after being with her for 5 years and moves out to live in a place called Yau Ma Tei. Kit becomes good friends with a neighbouring family (Mun's family) who sing every night in Temple Street for a living. As Tracy becomes more hateful of Kit and Mun, Kit and Mun develop a closer relationship every day unnoticed. With the audience having to wait impatiently for the two to get together, Kit makes a swift move at the end of episode 15 and kisses Mun on the lips for the first time.

Together, the couple go through a series of downfalls like Tracy stealing a song Kit wrote for Mun, Mun seeing her divorced father again, Ling leaving the family, and Kit rebonding with his mother. Just when Mun and Kit are closer than ever, fate turns against them. In episode 23, the two talk about marriage and right after a phone call where Mun told Kit not to buy an expensive wedding ring, Mun falls on the ground foreshadowing bone tumor will return to haunt her. Mun, once the strongest character in the story, loses her cheerfulness and optimism.

Cast
Lau family

Cheung family

Background Information

Mun
The birth of Mun initially caused multiple problems for Oi. Right when Oi found she was pregnant, her spouse Wen announced his family has arranged for him to marry Fan. Realising she was not capable of raising Mun alone, Oi decided to let Wen and Fan take care of her. At the age of five, Mun was diagnosed with bone tumor. Chances of her surviving were critically low and Fan who was at that time pregnant, abandoned Mun. Giving up her career in the professional singing industry, Oi rebonded with Mun who miraculously recovered.

Kit
Kit grew up without a proper father and mother. His mother left the family to be with another man and being frustrated at that time, told Kit's father he is not Kit's real dad. Due to this reason, Kit was treated much harsher compared to his closest family member and brother, Wa. A DNA test later proved that Kit was in fact Wa's biological brother. Later Started a music school using his talents to compose and teach.

Theme song
For the TV series, the theme song of the same name C'est la vie, mon chéri is sung by Jane Zhang, while for the 1993 film it was sung by Taiwanese singer One-Fang.

References

Television shows set in Hong Kong